Juan Antonio González Fernández (born 27 April 1987), commonly known as Juanan, is a Spanish professional footballer who plays as a centre-back.

Club career
Born in Palma de Mallorca, Juanan played youth football for three clubs, including local RCD Mallorca from ages 17 to 18. He signed with Deportivo de La Coruña in the summer of 2007, but appeared almost exclusively with the B team over the course of two Segunda División B seasons, being relegated in the second. With the main squad, he featured 21 minutes in a UEFA Cup match against AaB Fodbold, coming on as a substitute for Filipe Luís in an eventual 1–3 home loss in the round of 32 on 26 February 2009.

After his contract with the Galicians ended, Juanan joined another side in the third division, Real Madrid Castilla, appearing in 29 games (all starts) in his second year as the Real Madrid reserves fell short in the promotion playoffs. In late June 2011, he moved to Germany and signed for Fortuna Düsseldorf.

Juanan made his official debut with Fortuna on 24 July 2011, playing three minutes in a 1–1 2. Bundesliga draw at SC Paderborn 07. He scored his first goal in the competition on 16 September in a 4–2 away win over FC Erzgebirge Aue, and contributed another one in 19 matches as his team returned to the Bundesliga after a 15-year absence.

In the following seasons, Juanan represented in quick succession Újpest FC (Hungary), Recreativo de Huelva and CD Leganés, being relegated from the second tier with the second club and only appearing in the Copa del Rey with the third. On 3 February 2016, he signed with Rayo OKC from the North American Soccer League, being released from his contract on 11 July.

Juanan joined I-League champions Bengaluru FC on 8 August 2016, on a one-year deal. On 3 March 2018, the 31-year-old further renewed his link until 2020, agreeing to a new two-year extension that year.

On 26 July 2021, Juanan signed a one-year contract with Hyderabad FC also of the Indian Super League. He won that tournament for the second time in his debut campaign, helping defeat Kerala Blasters FC on penalties.

Career statistics

Honours
Újpest
Hungarian Cup: 2013–14

Bengaluru
Indian Super League: 2018–19
Federation Cup (India): 2016–17
Super Cup (India): 2018

Hyderabad
Indian Super League: 2021–22

References

External links

1987 births
Living people
Spanish footballers
Footballers from Palma de Mallorca
Association football defenders
Segunda División players
Segunda División B players
Deportivo Fabril players
Deportivo de La Coruña players
Real Madrid Castilla footballers
Recreativo de Huelva players
CD Leganés players
Bundesliga players
2. Bundesliga players
Fortuna Düsseldorf players
Nemzeti Bajnokság I players
Újpest FC players
North American Soccer League players
Rayo OKC players
Indian Super League players
I-League players
Bengaluru FC players
Hyderabad FC players
Spanish expatriate footballers
Expatriate footballers in Germany
Expatriate footballers in Hungary
Expatriate soccer players in the United States
Expatriate footballers in India
Spanish expatriate sportspeople in Germany
Spanish expatriate sportspeople in Hungary
Spanish expatriate sportspeople in the United States
Spanish expatriate sportspeople in India